Newhurst Quarry is a   geological Site of Special Scientific Interest on the southern outskirts of Shepshed in Leicestershire. It is a Geological Conservation Review site.

This is the only British site where hypogene mineralisation, deep in the earth, has been weathered during the Triassic, around 225 million years ago. It is also the only British site to have the minerals coulsonite and vesignieite.

The site is private land with no public access.

References

Sites of Special Scientific Interest in Leicestershire
Geological Conservation Review sites
Shepshed